The history of Jews in Somalia refers to the historical presence of Jewish communities in the Horn of Africa country of Somalia.

Judaism in the Somali peninsula has received little attention in the historical record. However, there is evidence of a Jewish presence in the area for centuries, with some members of the community openly practicing their faith and others practicing in secret. Many of the Jews in the area were Adenite and Yemenite Jews, who came to the region as merchants and religious service providers. However, a report in 1949 states that there were "no Jews left in Italian and British Somaliland". While the traditional Jewry in Somalia is known, little is known about the crypto-Jews who practice their faith discreetly.

Jewry in Somalia
The presence of Jewish communities in Somalia has been the subject of much speculation and debate throughout history. Historical records suggest that a small number of Jews, estimated to be around 100-200 individuals, migrated to Somalia in the early 1900s as traders and settled in coastal towns such as Berbera, Zeila, Mogadishu, and Brava. However, a report by the Jewish Telegraphic Agency (JTA) published in 1949 stated that there were "no Jews left in Italian and British Somaliland". Despite this, there are indications that both traditional and crypto-Jews may have continued to reside in Somalia even after this time.

Yemenite Jews in Somalia 
It is believed that a wave of Yemenite Jews arrived in the Somali territories in the 1880s, and other Ottoman friendly territories around the same time when Yemenites immigrated to the Ottoman Jerusalem. From 1881 to 1882, a few hundred Jews left but more arrived until 1914. Yemenite-Somali Jews served as prominent leaders in successive Somali governments of the 1960s and 1970s. However, in the 1970s when Somalia joined the Arab League, many Yemenite-Somali Jews sold their businesses and emigrated. Today, present-day Yemenite-Somali Jews are estimated to be no more than 5 to 10 merchant families widely distributed along the coast in Benadir coast, and northern Somali cities. The ruins of historic Eastern Synagogues can still be found in Obbia town in Somalia, but many smaller local synagogues in towns such as Hafun, Alula and Bender-Qasim were destroyed by the Italian fascists in the 1930s.

While the history of traditional Jewish communities in Somalia is relatively well-known, little is understood about the crypto-Jews who practiced their faith discreetly. The true extent of Jewish presence and influence in Somalia remains a topic of ongoing research and debate.

Israel–Somalia relations 

Israel was among the first nations to recognize Somalia's independence, but the country did not reciprocate by recognizing Israel and instead dispossessed and deported Jews from Somalia in 1967 in the wake of the Six-Day Arab-Israeli War.
Israel and Somalia have had a complicated relationship throughout history. Despite Israel being the first country to recognize Somalia's independence in 1960, relations between the two countries have been strained due to Somalia's support for the Palestinian cause and its alignment with Arab and Muslim countries.

In 1967, Somalia joined the Arab League and adopted a pro-Palestinian stance, leading to the expulsion of the small Jewish community in the country. Since then, relations between the two countries have been largely non-existent, with Somalia not recognizing Israel as a state.

In the 1970s, Islamic extremist group, the Muslim Brotherhood, brought a new phenomenon of anti-Semitism to Somalia. This led to the ostracization of the Yibir clan, a Somali clan with a widely accepted view of Jewish origin. The Yibir clan, along with other marginalized Somali clans such as the Tumaal, Madhiban, and Gaboye, are thought to have Hebrew origins but are now practicing Muslims.

In 2017, Somali President Mohamed Abdullahi "Farmajo" Mohamed refused to meet Israeli Prime Minister Benjamin Netanyahu during a visit to Kenya. During the African Heads of State meeting in Nairobi, Farmajo refused to engage in a meeting with Netanyahu. This move was praised by Hamas, with senior member Mousa Abu Marzouq stating that "attitudes have value and meaning, and their country has respect and appreciation, and their people have dignity". Izzat Al-Rishq, another member of Hamas, thanked the Somali president's position, which he said "reflects the authenticity of the brotherly Republic of Somalia in standing with Palestine and rejecting any normalization with an entity which occupies land and holy places." This stance is indicative of the ongoing tensions between Somalia and Israel, with many in Somalia standing in solidarity with Palestine and opposing any normalization of relations with Israel. 

in 2020, it was reported that Israel had been providing humanitarian aid to Somalia in the form of food and medical supplies.

In 2022, the President of Somaliland, a semi-autonomous region of Somalia, announced that it would establish diplomatic relations with Israel in the near future. This move was met with mixed reactions, with some praising it as a step towards modernization and development, while others criticized it as a betrayal of the Palestinian cause.

Ethiopian Judaism in the Somali peninsula

Judaism has a rich history in the Somali peninsula, with both Ethiopian and southern Arabian strains present in the region. While there is limited evidence of any Somali clans embracing Judaism during the pre-Islamic era, the conversion of individuals and families cannot be ruled out. The Hebrew heritage of marginalized Somali clans, including the Yibir, can be traced back to the Beta-Israel, or Ethiopian Jews. By the 16th century, the Somali population had largely adopted Islam as their primary religion.

One factor in the spread of Judaism in the region was the influence of the Ethiopian Empire. As a powerful kingdom that ruled over much of modern-day Somaliland, Ethiopia brought its brand of Orthodox Christianity and elements of Judaism with it. This is evident in the presence of Jewish archeological evidence in the region, such as ancient cemeteries in the Hargeisa region of Somaliland embossed with the Star of David. The Damot Kingdom, led by the Jewish Queen Gudit, also had a significant impact on the spread of Judaism in the region.

In addition to Ethiopian Judaism, the Somali peninsula also saw the arrival of southern Arabian Judaism, primarily through southern Somalia and limitedly through Somaliland. The Jewish community in Djibouti, for example, belongs to the influential Adenite and Yemenite Jewish diaspora.

The Jews of Djibouti

Another community with a history in the Somali peninsula is the Jews of Djibouti. The Jewish community in Djibouti has a history dating back to the 1800s. The first Jews to settle in Djibouti came from Aden, which was a British colony at the time. They were primarily Jews from Yemen, a region that had a large and diverse Jewish community. The community played a key role in the development of the port city of Djibouti, helping to build the territory then known as Côte Française des Somalis. The Jewish population reached its peak in the 1930s, with around 1,500 Jews living in the area. However, with the slowing of migration between Yemen and Djibouti in the early 20th century, much of the community consisted of native Djiboutians who converted and married into the established families.

During the time, the Jews were distinguished from their Muslim neighbors by their wearing of long sidelocks called payot and white fringed garments, similar to that of Yemenite Jews. Additionally, French authorities counted eleven Jewish traders in 1902, and indicated that they mainly worked as jewelers and craftsmen. They had several synagogues, including the grand synagogue in the city center on Rue de Rome. The Hahamim of Djibouti were sought for their halakhic expertise and skill throughout the region.

After the 1948 independence of Israel, the state organized Operation Magic Carpet in 1949 which evacuated about 45,000 Yemenite Jews threatened by political unrest from Yemen to Israel. Two hundred Jews from Djibouti were included in the evacuation operation. With the mass aliyah of 1949, the community never recovered, and over the decades, the remaining families gradually left Djibouti in favor of Israel or France. Today, there are only around 50 Jews remaining in Djibouti, mostly French expatriates with Jewish origins and the native population of "just a few isolated, unaffiliated Jews." The Jewish properties were settled by the local Issa people, a modest cemetery and the grand synagogue (which was renovated into office spaces in 2012, leaving only the original outside facade) are the only two Jewish structures still standing in the country.

Yibir

The Yibir, also spelled as Yibbir or Yebir, is a marginalized clan found in Somalia. They are believed to have Jewish roots, specifically tracing their heritage to the Beta Israel, also known as Ethiopian Jews. The Yibir have faced discrimination and marginalization within Somali society due to their perceived Jewish heritage.

There is limited historical evidence of the Yibir's Jewish origins, but it is believed that they may have been converts to Judaism or that Jewish traders and merchants may have intermarried with the clan. Some accounts suggest that the Yibir have preserved Jewish customs and practices, such as circumcision and kosher slaughter of animals. However, their Jewish identity has been largely kept secret for fear of persecution.

The Yibir have traditionally been associated with the practice of traditional healing and divination, which has led to further discrimination against them. They have also been marginalized economically and socially, often occupying the lowest rungs of Somali society.

Bibliography and further reading 
Altenmüller, H., J. O., Hunwick, R.S. O Fahey, and B. Spuler. The Writings of the Muslim Peoples of Northeastern Africa, Part 1, Volume 13. Leiden [u.a.]. (Brill, 2003), 174.

Angoulvant, Gabriel and Sylvain Vignéras. Djibouti, Mer Rouge, Abyssinie. Paris. 1902, 415.
Aram, Ben I. Somalia's Judeo-Christian Heritage: A Preliminary Survey.' Africa Journal of Evangelical Theology. 2003, 18-19.
Balisky, Paul E. Wolaitta Evangelists: A Study of Religious Innovations in Southern Ethiopia, 1937-1975. PhD. Thesis, Scotland. (University of Aberdeen, 1997), 8-9.
Bulhan, Hussein A. In-Between Three Civilizations: Archeology of Social Amnesia and Triple Heritage of Somali. Volume 1. Bethesda, Maryland. (Tayosan International Publishing, 2013), 159.
Bulliet, Richard. History of the World to 1500 CE (Session 22). Tropical Africa and Asia. Youtube.com. 23 November 2010. (Accessed 23 September 2013).
Diriye, Abdirahman M. Jews Historic Presence in Somaliland. The Times of Israel.26 April 2019. https://blogs.timesofisrael.com/jews-historic-presence-in-somaliland/(accessed 08 March 2021).
Fisher, Ian. Djibouti Journal; "Somalia Hebrews See a Better Day". New York Times. 15 August 2000. https://www.nytimes.com/2000/08/15/world/djibouti-journal-somalia-s-hebrews-see-a-better-day.html (accessed 21 January 2021)
Hable Selassie, Sergew. Ancient and Medieval Ethiopian History to 1270. Addis Abeba. (Haile Selassie I University, 1972), 225-232.
Hersi, Ali Abdirahman. The Arab Factor in Somali History: The Origins and the Development of Arab Enterprise and Cultural Influence in the Somali Peninsula. University of California, Los Angeles: Ph.D. Dissertation, 1977, 141.
James, F.L. The Unknown Horn of Africa. London. (G. Philip & Son. 1888), 70."

References 

Somalia
African Jews